The 2011–12 season is the 20th season of competitive football in the Cayman Islands.

National teams 

The home team or the team that is designated as the home team is listed in the left column; the away team is in the right column.

Senior

2014 FIFA World Cup qualification

Under-23

2012 CONCACAF Olympic qualification

League tables

Cayman Islands Premier League

Table

Cayman Islander clubs in international competitions

Elite SC

George Town SC

References
 Fifa - Cayman Islands Association
 Cayman Islands tables at Soccerway
 Cayman Islands national team at Soccerway